Ponikovica (Serbian Cyrillic: Пониковица) is a village located in the Užice municipality of Serbia.

Užice
Populated places in Zlatibor District